Lübben (Spreewald) station is a railway station in the town of Lübben, located in the Dahme-Spreewald district in Brandenburg, Germany.

References

Railway stations in Brandenburg
Railway stations in Germany opened in 1866
1866 establishments in Prussia
Buildings and structures in Dahme-Spreewald